Hugo García Velázquez (born September 14, 1981) is a Mexican football manager and former player. He was born in Mexico City.

References

External links

1981 births
Living people
Footballers from Mexico City
Association football midfielders
Mexican footballers
Club Universidad Nacional footballers
Dorados de Sinaloa footballers
C.D. Veracruz footballers
Atlante F.C. footballers
Altamira F.C. players
Liga MX players
Ascenso MX players
Mexican football managers